{{DISPLAYTITLE:C6H4}}
The molecular formula C6H4 (molar mass: 76.10 g/mol, exact mass: 76.0313 u) may refer to:

 Benzyne
 Phenylene
 Triafulvalene, or cyclopropenylidenecyclopropene
 Butalene